The Susquehanna Breakdown Music Festival, formerly known as The Old Farmer's Ball, is a one-day music festival held at the Toyota Pavilion at Montage Mountain in Scranton, Pennsylvania. The focus of the festival centers around the arts and spans musical genres including folk, Americana, roots, and bluegrass. The festival began in 2013 when Cabinet, a prominent regional band in Northeastern Pennsylvania, and Live Nation Entertainment started the festival to bring attention to not only their musical genre, but also to regional artists, farmers and craftsmen, who showcased and sold their wares throughout the festival. To bring further attention to the festival The Weekender and local pub The Backyard Alehouse signed on as sponsors, and thus the festival began. It was renamed in 2014 to reflect the name of a Cabinet song and to further personalize it for not only themselves, but both fans and concertgoers.

2016 Lineup
 Railroad Earth
 The Infamous Stringdusters
 Cabinet
 Twiddle
 The Larry Keel Experience
 Fruition
 Driftwood
 Cornmeal
 Pappy & Friends
 Flux Capacitor
 Swift Technique
 Coal Town Rounders
 FMO
 The Far Future
 Kopec
 The Dishonest Fiddlers
 Graham Mazer Duo

2015 Lineup
 Cabinet - 4 full sets including a Big Band set
 Bill Evans' Soulgrass
 Pigeons Playing Ping Pong
 Ryan Montbleau
 Citizens Band Radio
 Scott Law
 Ron Holloway
 Coal Town Rounders
 King Radio
 Grand Ole' Ditch
 Pappy
 Tom Graham & Justin Mazer
 George Wesley
 Still Hand String Band
 Mountain Sky Orchestra
 Boiled Owls
 Jay Noble

2014 Lineup
 Cabinet
 Sister Sparrow & the Dirty Birds
 Marco Benevento
 Floodwood featuring Al Schnier and Vinnie Amico
 Ron Holloway
 Terrapin Flyer
 Leroy Justice
 Schooley Mountain Band
 Driftwood
 The Brummy Brothers
 Eastbound Jesus
 Coal Town Rounders
 The Blind Owl Band
 Rogue Chimp
 And The Moneynotes
 FMO
 Pappy
 Tom Graham
 The Kalob Griffin Band
 Freight Train
 Jami Novak
 Abby Millon
 Jordan Tarter
 Mollie Edsell
 Sam Cutler

2013 Old Farmer's Ball Lineup
 Cabinet
 Yarn
 Holy Ghost Tent Revival
 MiZ
 And The Moneynotes
 Pappy
 Coal Town Rounders
 Kyle Morgan

References

External links

Music festivals in Pennsylvania
Tourist attractions in Scranton, Pennsylvania
2013 establishments in Pennsylvania
Music festivals established in 2013